Singha Sports Club is a former first-class cricket team in Sri Lanka. The team played first-class cricket in most seasons from 1989–90 to 2010–11. It played 155 matches, for 22 wins, 70 losses and 63 draws. It continues to compete in sub-first-class competitions.

See also
 List of Sri Lankan cricket teams

References

External links
 Singha Sports Club at CricketArchive

Former senior cricket clubs of Sri Lanka